Daan Van Gijseghem (born 2 March 1988 in Oudenaarde) is a Belgian football player who currently plays for Oudenaarde in the Belgian First Amateur Division.

Career
On 8 January 2010, Club Brugge signed the former RE Mouscron defender on a free transfer until June 2013. Following the 2011-12 season however, he moved to Mons.

References

External links
 
 
 

1988 births
Living people
Belgian footballers
People from Oudenaarde
Royal Excel Mouscron players
Club Brugge KV players
R.A.E.C. Mons players
Belgian Pro League players
Association football defenders
Sint-Eloois-Winkel Sport players
Footballers from East Flanders